Manuel Tom Bihr (born 17 September 1993) is a professional footballer who plays as a centre-back for Thai League 1 club Bangkok United. Born in Germany, he plays for the Thailand national team.

Personal life
Bihr was born in Herrenberg to a German father and a Thai mother from Chiang Mai.

International career
In 2021 he was called up by Thailand national team for the 2020 AFF Championship.

Career statistics

Club

International

Honours

International
Thailand
 AFF Championship (1): 2020

References

External links
 

1993 births
Living people
Manuel Bihr
Manuel Bihr
German footballers
German people of Thai descent
Association football defenders
2. Bundesliga players
1. FC Nürnberg II players
Bundesliga players
1. FC Nürnberg players
3. Liga players
Stuttgarter Kickers players
Manuel Bihr
Manuel Bihr